Achrotelium is a genus of rust fungi in the Chaconiaceae family. The genus contains five species that are found in the USA, Philippines, India, and Zimbabwe.

References

External links

Pucciniales